Knights of the Round Table is a role-playing game published by Little Soldier Games in 1976.

Description
Knights of the Round Table is set in Arthur's Camelot. The combat system is simple and uses cards (included).

Publication history
Knights of the Round Table was designed by Phil Edgren, with art by Bob Charette, and was published by Little Soldier Games in 1976 as a 64-page digest-sized book.

Reception
Lew Pulsipher reviewed Knights of the Round Table for White Dwarf #6, and stated that "This is a relaxing change from the tac-nukes, lasers, and superhypnosis of D&D. Probably the skill level which can be imposed in Knights of the Round Table is not high, but the same is true of many other role-playing games. Speed and simplicity are sufficient compensation."

Lawrence Schick describes the game as a "Primitive early system".

References

Fantasy role-playing games
Games based on Arthurian legend
Role-playing games introduced in 1976